Robert Kelly Slater (born February 11, 1972) is an American professional surfer, best known for being crowned World Surf League champion a record 11 times. Slater is widely regarded as the greatest professional surfer of all time, and holds 56 Championship Tour victories. Slater is also the oldest surfer still active on the World Surf League, winning his 8th Billabong Pipeline Masters title at age 49.

Early years 
Slater grew up in Cocoa Beach, Florida, where he still lives. He is the son of Judy Moriarity and Stephen Slater.  He has two brothers, Sean and Stephen, and a daughter, born in 1996.

The son of a bait-store proprietor, Slater grew up near the water, and he began surfing at age five.  By age 10 he was winning age-division events up and down the Atlantic coast, and in 1984 he won his first age-division United States championship title. Two years later he finished third in the junior division at the world amateur championships in England, and he won the Pacific Cup junior championship in Australia the following year.

After turning professional in 1990, Slater struggled during his first two years on the professional tour and 43rd in the world rankings those years. In 1992 he secured podium (top-three) finishes in three of his first five events before winning his first professional tour event, the Rip Curl Pro, in France. His win in that year's prestigious Pipeline Masters in Hawaii secured his first world title, and at age 20 he became the youngest surfing world champion ever. Slater finished sixth in the 1993 rankings but came back in 1994 to win the world tour during 1994–1998, during which time televised surfing events had become increasingly popular. He then took a break from competitive surfing at the end of 1998, before returning to the world pro tour in 2002.

Accomplishments

Surfing 
Slater, having grown up in Florida, was never truly comfortable in waves of consequence until a trip to Oahu in 1987. A giant northwest swell was pounding the coast, closing out breaks from Waimea to Sunset.  He drove to Makaha, where he was greeted with 40' (Hawaiian scale) waves breaking across the bay.  Slater parked and saw Brandon "Big Wave" Davis waxing up his 11' board.  Big Wave Davis simply gave Slater a wink and they paddled out, trading waves all afternoon.  Slater credits Davis in his biography stating "Brandon's knowledge and poise in large surf had a huge impact on my career. Anytime I'm dropping in to a big wave, I think back to that wink in the Makaha parking lot and I push myself over the edge." Some of his favorite surf spots include Mondos in Ventura, California, US,  Pipeline in Hawaii, Kirra in Gold Coast, Queensland, Australia, Jeffreys Bay in South Africa, Minis in Ireland, Taghazout in Morocco, Veiny's in New Zealand, Soup Bowls in Barbados, and Sebastian Inlet near his home in Florida.

As of late, Slater has won another Pipe Masters.

Musical appearances and collaborations
Slater plays guitar and ukulele, and has performed with Jack Johnson and Angus Stone. Kelly Slater joined Rob Machado and Peter King in a band called The Surfers.

Slater performed a song with Ben Harper during Harper's concert in Santa Barbara on August 1, 2006. He also performed Rockin' in the Free World with grunge band Pearl Jam on July 7, 2006, in San Diego.

In 1999, he appeared alongside Garbage singer Shirley Manson in the promotional video for the band's single "You Look So Fine". He played a man washed up on a seashore, then rescued by Manson.

Mixed media
Slater played the recurring character Jimmy Slade on seven episodes of the popular TV show Baywatch in the early 1990s. He appeared in an episode of the reality show The Girls Next Door, and has starred in many surf films during his career.

In the late 1990s Slater, with friends and fellow pro surfers Rob Machado and Peter King, formed a band called The Surfers. The trio released an album in 1998 titled Songs from the Pipe, a reference to the famous surf spot  Pipeline on Oahu, Hawaii. Slater toured Australia with his band, performing in venues such as the Opera House and parliament house.

A video game named Kelly Slater's Pro Surfer by Treyarch and published by Activision was released in 2002. Slater also appeared as a playable character in Tony Hawk's Pro Skater 3 prior to this, complete with a surfboard.

In addition to the ASP tour, Slater competed in the X-Games in 2003 and 2004 winning back to back gold medals.

Environmentalism and philanthropy
Slater is an advocate of a sustainable and clean living lifestyle. Slater is also a fundraiser and spokesperson for suicide prevention awareness. He has surfed in celebrity events for Surfers Against Suicide, telling sports website 'Athletes Talk': "I've lost a couple of friends myself to suicide and it's just a horrible thing that can be prevented. People get in this dark place and they don't know what to do so it's always nice to see a non-profit that isn't turning into anything else other than just trying to help people."

Slater is passionate about preserving oceans globally and protecting temperate reefs in California through his relationship with Reef Check.

In February 2017, Slater and fellow competitive surfer Jérémy Florès called for a daily cull of bull sharks by French authorities on Réunion following eight shark-related fatalities over the preceding six years.  Environmentalists criticized the proposal, with Ken Collins of the University of Southampton describing it as "insane".

On May 8, 2010, the United States House of Representatives honored Slater in H. Res. 792 for his "outstanding and unprecedented achievements in the world of surfing and for being an ambassador of the sport and excellent role model." This resolution, sponsored by Florida representative Bill Posey and sponsored by 10 representatives, passed without objection by a voice vote.

Slater is on the Board of Advisors (the Ocean Advocacy Advisory Board) of ocean conservation organization Sea Shepherd Conservation Society.

Professional development
Slater historically and exclusively rode Channel Islands Surfboards equipped with his own signature series of FCS fins. As the media hype grew around Slater's lack of board stickers in 2015, Slater had been seen riding unlabelled Firewire surfboards, acquiring the company in 2014. In 2016 Slater released his own line of boards.   there are four Slater Designs models in the Firewire range: the Gamma, Cymatic, Omni and Sci-fi.

Since 1990 Slater had been sponsored primarily by surfwear industry giant Quiksilver until his departure on April 1, 2014.  After Leaving Quiksilver, Slater, in collaboration with Kering, established the eco-friendly and sustainable apparel company 'Outerknown'.

In 2014, Slater launched the beverage company Purps in collaboration with RVCA founder Pat Tenore and Dr. Chris Schaumburg. Since 2013, Slater has been a brand ambassador for The Chia Company, based in western Australia.

Wave Pool

Wave Pool was a ten-year 'experiment' to create the perfect inland wave situated in inland California. Kelly modeled the wave after a combination of Lower Trestles, California, a tubing wave on Oahu, Hawaii, and a secret right in Micronesia in the Marshall Islands. The project was a success and the surfing world was abuzz with the possibilities, mostly due to the wave's perfect shape and speed.  In 2016 the World Surf League (WSL) acquired a majority stake in the Kelly Slater Wave Company (KSWC) for an undisclosed sum.

Kelly Slater Surf Ranch
The WSL held a test event for professional surfers, including Filipe Toledo, Mick Fanning, Kanoa Igarashi, Gabriel Medina and others, at the Kelly Slater Surf Ranch (located at ) on Tuesday, September 19, 2017. The Surf Ranch also hosted the WSL Founders Cup on May 5–6, 2018. The contest featured five teams - US, Brazil, Australia, Europe and World - made up of men's and women's surfers from the WSL Championship Tour. The WSL Surf Ranch was constructed outside of Lemoore, California and has remained private and exclusive.

Surf Ranch Florida
There were previously plans to develop Surf Ranch Florida, a man-made surfing lake in Palm Beach County.  County commissioners unanimously approved plans for the county to evaluate the proposed surf facility in 2017.  Brian Waxman, project leader for Surf Ranch Florida, said the World Surf League was considering bringing the wave lake to the Sunshine State for its weather and heritage of world-class surfers.  It would have encompassed an 80-acre lot east of Jupiter Farms, near the Pine Glades natural area. Despite acquiring the 80-acre property for $6.5 million dollars in November 2017, WSL announced that plans to develop the surf facility at this location were cancelled in 2019 due to "unforeseen challenges" related to an unexpectedly high groundwater table elevation.

La Quinta, California

Competitive achievements
Slater has been crowned World Surf League Champion a record 11 times, including five consecutive titles in 1994–98. He is the youngest (at age 20) and the oldest (at age 39) to win the WSL men's title. On winning his fifth world title in 1997, Slater passed Australian surfer Mark Richards to become the most successful male champion in the history of the sport. In 2007 he also became the all-time leader in career event wins by winning the Boost Mobile Pro event at Lower Trestles near San Clemente, California. The previous record was held by Slater's childhood hero, three-time world champion Tom Curren. After earlier being awarded the title prematurely as a result of a miscalculation by the Association of Surfing Professionals (ASP), on November 6, 2011, Slater officially won his eleventh ASP world title at the Rip Curl Pro Search San Francisco, by winning his fourth round heat.

In May 2005, in the final heat of the Billabong Tahiti Pro contest at Teahupo'o, Slater became the first surfer ever to be awarded two perfect scores for a total 20 out of 20 points under the ASP two-wave scoring system (fellow American Shane Beschen made the first perfect score under the previous three-wave system in 1996).

Slater did it again in June 2013 at the quarter finals at the Volcom Fiji Pro with two perfect ten waves, only the fourth person in history to do so.

Slater is also the oldest surfer to perform a ten-point ride in World Surf League competition at the age of 47 at the 2019 Billabong Pipe Masters.

2013 stats and results
World ranking: 2nd
Points: 54,150

Event results in 2013
Quiksilver Pro (Gold Coast, Australia): 1st 
Rip Curl Pro  (Bells Beach, Victoria, Australia): 13th 
Volcom Fiji Pro (Tavarua/Namotu, Fiji): 1st 
Oakley Pro Bali (Keramas, Bali, Indonesia): 9th  
Billabong Pro Teahupoo (Teahupoo, Taiarapu, French Polynesia): 2nd

Billabong Pipeline Masters (Pipeline, Oahu, Hawaii): 1st

He also won many other surfing titles.

2012 stats and results
World ranking: 2nd
Points: 55,450

Event results in 2012
Quiksilver Pro presented by Land Rover (Gold Coast, Snapper Rocks, Australia): 5th 
Rip Curl Pro presented by Ford Ranger (Bells Beach, Victoria, Australia): 2nd
Billabong Rio Pro (Rio de Janeiro, Brazil): INJ 
Volcom Fiji Pro (Tavarua/Namotu, Fiji): 1st
Billabong Pro Tahiti (Teahupoo, Tahiti): 13th 
Hurley Pro (Lower Trestles, San Clemente, California, US): 1st 
Quiksilver Pro France (Hossegor-Landes, France): 1st 
Rip Curl Pro (Peniche, Portugal): 13th 
O'Neill Coldwater Classic Santa Cruz (Santa Cruz, California, US): 9th 
Billabong Pipeline Masters (Pipeline, Oahu, Hawaii): 3rd

2011 stats and results
World ranking: 2011 Champion
Points: 68,100

Event results in 2011
Quiksilver Pro Gold Coast (Snapper Rocks, Australia): 1st 
Rip Curl Pro, Bells Beach, (Victoria, Australia): 5th
Billabong Rio Pro (Rio de Janeiro, Brazil): 13th
Nike Pro US Open (Huntington Beach, California, US): 1st
Billabong Pro Teahupoo (Teahupoo, Tahiti): 1st 
Quiksilver Pro New York (Long Beach, New York, US): 2nd 
Hurley Pro (Lower Trestles, San Clemente, California, US): 1st 
Quiksilver Pro France (Hossegor, France): 5th 
Rip Curl Pro Portugal (Peniche, Portugal): 2nd 
Rip Curl Search (Ocean Beach, San Francisco, US): 5th 
Billabong Pipeline Masters (Pipeline, Oahu, Hawaii): 3rd

2010 stats and results
World ranking: 2010 Champion
Points: 69000

Event results in 2010
Quiksilver Pro, Gold Coast (Snapper Rocks, Australia): 9th
Rip Curl Pro, Bells Beach (Australia): 1st
Hang Loose Pro (Santa Catarina, Brasil): 2nd
Billabong Pro (Jeffreys Bay, South Africa): 17th
Billabong Pro Teahupoo (Teahupoo, Tahiti): 3rd
Hurley Pro (Lower Trestles, San Clemente, California, US): 1st
Quiksilver Pro France (Hossegor, France): 2nd
Rip Curl Pro Portugal (Peniche, Portugal): 1st
Rip Curl Pro Search 2010 (Middles Beach, Isabela, Puerto Rico): 1st
Billabong Pipeline Masters (Pipeline, Oahu, Hawaii): 3rd

2009 stats and results
World ranking: 6th.
Points: 6136

Event results in 2009
Quiksilver Pro, Gold Coast (Snapper Rocks, Australia): 17th
Rip Curl Pro, Bells Beach (Australia): 17th
Billabong Pro, Tahiti (Teahupoo, Tahiti): 17th
Hang Loose Pro (Santa Catarina, Brasil): 1st
Billabong Pro (Jeffreys Bay, South Africa): 9th
Hurley Pro (Lower Trestles, San Clemente, California, US): 3rd
Quiksilver Pro France (Hossegor, France): 5th
Billabong Pro, Mundaka (Mundaka, Spain): 3rd
Rip Curl Search (Peniche, Portugal): 17th
Billabong Pipeline Masters (Pipeline, Oahu, Hawaii): 2nd

2008 stats and results
World ranking: 2008 Champion 
Points: 8832

Event results
Quiksilver Pro, Gold Coast (Snapper Rocks, Australia): 1st
Rip Curl Pro, Bells Beach (Australia): 1st
Billabong Pro, Tahiti (Teahupoo, Tahiti): 17th
Globe Pro, Fiji (Tavarua, Fiji): 1st
Billabong Pro, J-Bay (Jeffreys Bay, South Africa): 1st
Rip Curl Search (Bali, Indonesia): 17th
Boost Mobile Pro (Lower Trestles, San Clemente, California, US): 1st
Quiksilver Pro France (Hossegor, France): 2nd
Billabong Pro, Mundaka (Mundaka, Spain): 9th
Hang Loose Pro (Santa Catarina, Brasil): DNS
Billabong Pipeline Masters (Pipeline, Oahu, Hawaii): 1st

History of wins
2022

 Billabong Pro Pipeline (Oahu, Hawaii)

2019
 Triple Crown of Surfing (Specialty-Hawaii)
2016
 Billabong Pro (Teahupoo, Tahiti) - WT

2014
 Volcom Pipe Pro (Pipeline, Hawaii) - QS 5-Stars
2013
 Quiksilver Pro (Gold Coast, Australia) - WT
 Volcom Fiji Pro (Tavarua/Namotu, Fiji) - WT
 Billabong Pipeline Masters (Pipeline, Hawaii) - WT
2012
 Volcom Fiji Pro (Tavarua, Fiji) - WT
 Hurley Pro (Trestles, California, US) - WT
 Quiksilver Pro France (South West Coast, France) - WT
2011

 Quiksilver Pro (Gold Coast, Australia) - WT
 Billabong Pro (Teahupoo, Tahiti) - WT
 Hurley Pro (Trestles, California, US) - WT
 Nike US Open of Surfing (Huntington Beach, California, US) - QS Prime
2010
 Rip Curl Pro (Bells Beach, Australia) - WT
 Hurley Pro (Trestles, California, US) - WT
 Rip Curl Pro (Peniche, Portugal) - WT
 Rip Curl Search (Middles, Isabela, Puerto Rico) - WT
2009
 Hang Loose Santa Catarina Pro (Santa Catarina, Brasil) - WT
2008
 Quiksilver Pro (Gold Coast, Australia) - WT
 Rip Curl Pro (Bells Beach, Australia) - WT
 Globe Pro (Tavarua, Fiji) - WT
 Billabong Pro (Jeffreys Bay, South Africa) - WT
 Boost Mobile Pro (Trestles, California, US) - WT
 Billabong Pipeline Masters (Pipeline, Hawaii) - WT
2007
 Boost Mobile Pro (Trestles, California, US) - WT
2006
 Quiksilver Pro (Gold Coast, Australia) - WT
 Rip Curl Pro (Bells Beach, Australia) - WT
2005
 Billabong Pro (Teahupoo, Tahiti) - WT
 Globe Pro Fiji (Tavarua, Fiji) - WT
 Billabong Pro (Jeffreys Bay, South Africa) - WT
 Boost Mobile Pro (Trestles, California, US) - WT
2004
 X-Games SRF The Game
 Snickers Australian Open - QS
 Energy Australia Open - QS
2003
 X-Games SRF The Game
 Billabong Pro (Teahupoo, Tahiti) - WT
 Billabong Pro (Jeffreys Bay, South Africa) - WT
 Billabong Pro (Mundaka, Spain) - WT
 Nova Schin Festival (Santa Catarina, Brazil) - WT
2002
 Quiksilver in Memory of Eddie Aikau (Specialty-Hawaii)
2000
 Gotcha Pro Tahiti (Teahupoo, Tahiti) - WT
1999
 Mountain Dew Pipeline Masters (Pipeline, Hawaii) - WT
1998
 Billabong Pro (Gold Coast, Australia) - WT
 Triple Crown of Surfing (Specialty-Hawaii)
1997
 Coke Surf Classic (Manly Beach, Australia) - QS 6-Stars
 Billabong Pro (Gold Coast, Australia) - WT
 Tokushima Pro (Tokushima, Japan) - WT
 Marui Pro (Chiba, Japan) - WT
 Kaiser Summer Surf (Rio de Janeiro, Brazil) - WT
 Grand Slam (Specialty-Australia)
 Typhoon Lagoon Surf Challenge (Specialty-US)
1996
 Coke Surf Classic (Narrabeen, Australia)
 Rip Curl Pro Saint Leu (Saint Leu, Reunion Island)
 CSI presents Billabong Pro (Jeffreys Bay, South Africa)
 U.S. Open of Surfing (Huntington Beach, California, US)
 Rip Curl Pro Hossegor (Hossegor, France)
 Quiksilver Surfmasters (Biarritz, France)
 Chiemsee Gerry Lopez Pipe Masters (Pipeline, Hawaii)
 Sud Ouest Trophee (Specialty-France)
 Da Hui Backdoor Shootout (Specialty-Hawaii)
1995
 Quiksilver Pro (Grajagan, Indonesia)
 Chiemsee Pipe Masters (Pipeline, Hawaii)
 Triple Crown of Surfing (Specialty-Hawaii)
1994
 Rip Curl Pro (Bells Beach, Australia)
 Gotcha Lacanau Pro (Lacanau, France)
 Chiemsee Gerry Lopez Pipe Masters (Pipeline, Hawaii)
 Bud Surf Tour Seaside Reef (WQS-US)
 Bud Surf Tour Huntington (WQS-US)
 Sud Ouest Trophee (Specialty-France)
1993
 Marui Pro (Chiba, Japan)
1992
 Rip Curl Pro Landes (Hossegor, France)
 Marui Pipe Masters (Pipeline, Hawaii)
1990
 Body Glove Surfbout (Trestles, California, US)

References 
This will be an extra references section.

Personal life
Slater is an avid golfer and practices the sport of Brazilian jiu-jitsu.

Taylor Slater is the only child of Kelly Slater and Tamara Michelle (ex girlfriend) born in 1996.

Kelly’s current girlfriend, and co-founder of MIKOH, is Kalani Miller.   They have been dating for 15 years.

His surfing inspirations are said to be Andy Irons, Shane Dorian, Josh Kerr, Dane Reynolds, Andrew Bloom, Drew Phelps, Ken Wells, Vaughan Trotman, and Hunter Collins.

Filmography

Films 
 Surfers – The Movie (1990)
 Kelly Slater in Black and White (1991)
 Momentum 1 (1992)
 Focus (1994)
 Endless Summer II (1994)
 Factory Seconds (1995)
 Momentum 2 (1996)
 Good Times (1996)
 Kelly Slater In Kolor (1997)
 The Show (1997) gas
 Loose Change (1999)
 Hit & Run (2000)
 Thicker than Water (2000)
 One Night at McCool's (2001)
 September Sessions (2002)
 Step into Liquid (2003)
 Campaign 1 (2003)
 Riding Giants (2004)
 Doped Youth 'Groovy Avalon' (2004)
 Young Guns 1, 2 & 3 (2004–2008)
 Campaign 2 (2005)
 Burn (2005)
 Letting Go (2006)
 Surf's Up (2007)
 Down the Barrel (2007)
 Bra Boys: Blood is Thicker than Water (2007)
 Bustin' Down the Door (2008)
 One Track Mind (2008)
 Kelly Slater Letting Go (2008)
 Waveriders (2008)
 The Ocean (2008)
 A Fly in the Champagne (2009) (featuring Kelly Slater and Andy Irons)
 Cloud 9 (2009)
 Keep Surfing (2009)
 Ultimate Wave Tahiti (2010)
 Fighting Fear (2011)
 Wave Warriors 3
 View from a Blue Moon (2015)
 Momentum Generation (2018)

Cameo appearances 
"You Look So Fine" - Garbage music video (1999)
'"Surf's Up" (2007)
View From A Blue Moon (2015)

Television
 Baywatch, 7 episodes (1992–1996)
 The Jersey, surfing episode 18 (2001)
 The Girls Next Door, "Surf's Up" (one episode)
 The Ultimate Surfer, "Kelly-vision" cameos

See also
Wave pool
Wavegarden

Books
 Pipe Dreams: A Surfer's Journey (2003), 
 Kelly Slater: For the Love (2008),

References

External links

 Official website
 

1972 births
American surfers
Laureus World Sports Awards winners
Living people
People from Cocoa Beach, Florida
Sportspeople from Florida
World Surf League surfers
X Games athletes